Abū'l-Fath Tauke Mūhammad bin Salqām-Jahangīr Khan (romanized: Äbılfat Täuke Mūhammed bin Salqam-Jahanğyr han) (1635 – 1715, r. 1680 – 1715) ruled as a Kazakh khan of the Kazakh Khanate.
In 1652 after the death of his father Jahangir Khan, the ruler of Jungars Erdeni Batyr had dramatically increased his military pressure on the Kazakh Khanate in an attempt to conquer it. Eventually he died in 1670.  Kaldan Boshakty replaced him (1670–1699, in some sources 1670–1697), who was later succeeded by Seban Rabtan (1699–1729).  All through these invasions, a weak Kazakh ruler named Bahadur Khan had taken the throne.  He was quickly deposed by the Kazakhs, allowing Tauke Muhammad to take the Kazakh throne.  

The hardest time for the Kazakhs started from 1698. When the Kazakhs divided their khanate into Juzes, maintaining unity became a complicated task. Tauke Muhammad, who remained the khan of all three Juzes, managed to keep the unity of Kazakhs, earning him the honorific title "Shah-i-Turan" (Persian for "King of Turan") like his father before him.  

In 1692 Tauke Muhammad connected with Peter I of Russia. Eventually, the Russian Empire lowered the trade taxes (also known as bazh tax).
In 1710 by uniting 3 juzes in the place Kuntobe (near the city of Tashkent), Tauke Muhammad fought Jungars in the place named Augyr and gained a victory.

With Tauke Khan's death in 1715, the three "jüzes" of the Kazakh Khanate — the Great jüz, the Middle jüz and the Little jüz — were no longer able to pursue a unified political policy. Abu'l Khair Khan of the Little jüz was nominally the senior khan of the entire Kazakh Khanate, but in practice each jüz was ruled independently by its own khan.

Tauke Khan is also known for refining the Kazakh code of laws, and reissuing it under the title "Жеті Жарғі" (transliterated: "Jetı Jarğı" — "Seven Charters").

See also

List of kazakh khans
Kazakh Khanate
History of Kazakhstan

References

Kazakh Khanate is described in historical texts such as the Tarikh-i-Rashidi (1541–1545) by Muhammad Haidar Dughlat, and Zhamigi-at-Tavarikh (1598–1599) by Kadyrgali Kosynuli Zhalayir.

Kazakh khans
Kazakhstani Muslims